Eta Corvi (Eta Crv, η Corvi, η Crv) is an F-type main-sequence star, the sixth-brightest star in the constellation of Corvus. Two debris disks have been detected orbiting this star, one at ~150 AU, and a warmer one within a few astronomical units (AU).

Properties

Eta Corvi is only about 30% of the Sun's age. The concentration of iron and other heavy elements in its atmosphere is only about 93% that of the Sun's. The projected rotational velocity at the star's equator (v sin i) is 68 km/s - more than 30 times faster than that for the Sun. A yellow-white main sequence star of spectral type F2V, it has an estimated surface temperature of 6950 K. It is 1.52 times as massive as the Sun and is 4.87 times as luminous. It is 59 light-years distant from the Solar System.

The IRAS satellite detected an excess of infrared radiation from this star, beyond what would normally be expected for a stellar object of this class. Observations in the submillimetre band confirmed the presence of excess dust in orbit around the star having about 60% of the mass of the Moon and a temperature of 80 K. The data indicated a debris disk with an estimated maximum radius of 180 AU from the star, or 180 times the separation of Earth and the Sun. (Compare with the Kuiper belt, which extends out to 55 AU from the Sun.)

Recent submillimeter observations confirm the presence of an outer flat, circumstellar disk of debris with an outer radius of 150 AU. It is oriented at an inclination to the line of sight from the Earth. Most of the inner 100 AU of the disk is relatively free of material, which suggests it was cleared away by a planetary system.  In addition, infrared radiation which appears to be from an inner, hotter, debris disk within 3.5 AU of the star has been observed.

Since the Poynting–Robertson effect would cause the dust in the outer disk to spiral in to the star within 20 million years, much younger than the age of the system, the observed presence of dust in the outer disk means that it must be constantly replenished.  It is thought that this happens by the collisions of planetesimals orbiting at a distance of about 150 AU, which are repeatedly broken down into smaller and smaller pieces, eventually becoming dust.  The origin of the inner disk is not clear.  It may have originated from planetesimals recently having moved from the outer regions of the system into the inner system, in a process similar to the Late Heavy Bombardment in the history of the Solar System, and subsequently being ground to dust by collisions.

Possible Late Heavy Bombardment
In 2010–2011, Carey Lisse of the Johns Hopkins University Applied Physics Laboratory and his group analyzed the Spitzer IRS 5–35 μm spectrum of the warm, ~360K circumstellar dust and found that it showed clear evidence for warm, water- and carbon-rich dust at ~3 AU from the central star, in the system's habitable zone, uncoupled and in a separate reservoir from the system's extended sub-mm dust ring at 150 ± 20 AU. Spectral features similar in kind and amplitude to those found for ultra-primitive (i.e., formed very early in the lifetime of the Eta Corvi system) ~10 Myr old cometary material were found (water ice and gas, olivines and pyroxenes, amorphous carbon and metal sulfides), in addition to emissions due to impact produced silica and high temperature/pressure carbonaceous phases. The warm dust is very primitive, and definitely not from an asteroidal parent body. A large amount, at least 3 x 1019 kg, of 0.1 – 1000 μm warm dust is present, in a roughly collisional equilibrium distribution with dn/da ~ a−3.5. This is the equivalent of a 160-kilometer-radius centaur or medium-sized Kuiper belt object of 1.0 g cm−3 density or a "comet" of 260 km radius and 0.40 g cm−3 density. The warm dust mass is much larger than that of a solar system comet (1012 – 1015 kg), but is very similar to the mass of a Kuiper belt object (1019 – 1021 kg). The amount of water tied up in the observed material, ~1019 kg, is > 0.1% of the water in the Earth's oceans, and the amount of carbon is also considerable, ~1018 kg.

The team found that the best model for what is going on is that some process (e.g., planetary migration) is dynamically exciting the Eta Corvi-equivalent of the Solar System's Kuiper belt (KB), causing frequent collisions amongst Kuiper belt objects (KBOs) and producing the observed copious Kuiper belt dust. As part of this process, one or more of the excited KBOs was scattered onto an orbit that sent it into the inner system, where it collided with a planetary-class body at ~3 AU, releasing a large amount of thermally unprocessed, primitive ice and carbon-rich dust. Their analysis suggests that the system is likely a good analogue for the Late Heavy Bombardment (LHB) processes that occurred in the early Solar System at 0.6–0.8 Gyr after the formation of the calcium–aluminium-rich inclusions (minerals such as olivines that are among the first solids condensed from the cooling protoplanetary disk) and is thus worthy of further detailed study in order to understand the nature of the LHB. It is also a good system to perform a search for a rocky planetary body at ~3 AU (the impacted planet), and for a giant planet at ~115 AU (the Kuiper belt dynamical stirrer at ~ the 3:2 resonance of the Kuiper belt dust at 150 AU).

Name
In Chinese astronomy, Eta Corvi is called 左轄, Pinyin: Zuǒxiá, meaning Left Linchpin, because this star is marking itself and stands alone in the Left Linchpin asterism, Chariot mansion (see : Chinese constellation). 左轄 (Zuǒxiá), westernized into Tso Hea, but the name Tso Hea was already designated for β Corvi (Kraz) by R.H. Allen.

References

Corvus (constellation)
Circumstellar disks
F-type main-sequence stars
Corvi, 8
Corvi, Eta
109085
061174
0471
4775
Durchmusterung objects